"Danger" is a single by Australian rock band AC/DC, from the album Fly on the Wall released in 1985. A stripped down blues shuffle, it was written by Brian Johnson, Angus Young, and Malcolm Young.

Cash Box said that the song "is a gritty and blues inflected effort" with "growling vocals and tale of drunken fun."  Billboard said that the "monarchs of metal growl and bluster at a lumbering pace."

In most territories, the single's b-side was "Back in Business", but in Australia and New Zealand, "Hell or High Water" was featured.

Danger was played live 1985 one time. Then the song got bannished from all live sets. It was replaced with Sin City and Have a Drink on Me.

Personnel
 Brian Johnson – lead vocals
 Angus Young – lead guitar
 Malcolm Young –  rhythm guitar
 Cliff Williams – bass guitar
 Simon Wright – drums

Charts

References

AC/DC songs
1985 singles
Songs written by Angus Young
Songs written by Malcolm Young
Songs written by Brian Johnson
1985 songs
Atlantic Records singles

Danger was played live once